Grono may refer to:

Places 
 Grono, Switzerland, municipality in Graubünden
 Mount Grono

Other uses 
 Grono (surname)
 Grono.net, social networking website in Poland